Ednei Ferreira de Oliveira, commonly known as Ednei is a Brazilian footballer who plays as a right-back.

Career
Ednei spent three seasons with Armenian Premier League side FC Mika early in his career.

He has represented Internacional in 2013 and Chapecoense in 2014 at the top level of Brazilian football, Campeonato Brasileiro Série A. Subsequently, he represented ABC, Atlético Goianiense and Goiás in Campeonato Brasileiro Série B in the 2015 and 2016 seasons.

Ednei arrived at Brasil de Pelotas in July 2017 and, after a spell with Novo Hamburgo for the first part of 2019, rejoined in April.

References

External links
 
 

Living people
1985 births
Brazilian footballers
Association football defenders
América Futebol Clube (MG) players
Trindade Atlético Clube players
FC Mika players
Veranópolis Esporte Clube Recreativo e Cultural players
Sport Club Internacional players
Associação Chapecoense de Futebol players
Esporte Clube XV de Novembro (Piracicaba) players
ABC Futebol Clube players
Atlético Clube Goianiense players
Goiás Esporte Clube players
Grêmio Esportivo Brasil players
Esporte Clube Novo Hamburgo players
Associação Ferroviária de Esportes players
Caucaia Esporte Clube players
Campeonato Brasileiro Série A players
Campeonato Brasileiro Série B players
Armenian Premier League players